This is a list of songwriters in the Geordie dialect of English, spoken in Tyneside.

Poets and songwriters

Pre-20th century

20th century and forward 
 Robert Allen (poet)
 Eric Boswell - songwriter/poet
 Henry Brewis - poet, writer, cartoonist, illustrator
 Bill Griffiths (poet)

Antiquarians, historians, authors, mining engineers, scientists and similar 
 John Balmbra - Entrepreneur, owner of the famous Music Hall
 Sir David Brewster - subject of a song and a scientist/engineer and inventor of the Kaleidoscope c1820. The song "The Pitman's Skellyscope" written by William Mitford appears in a great many chapbooks, possibly due to its novelty value, including on page 147 of Thomas Allan's Illustrated Edition of Tyneside Songs and Readings
 John Collingwood Bruce - Author and editor, He and John Stokoe co-edited "Northumbrian Minstrelsy"
 Mr W. Cail - an author/historian/antiquarian who collected manuscripts, particularly relating to the songs and poems of Edward Chicken. He is mentioned on page 5 of Thomas Allan's Illustrated Edition of Tyneside Songs and Readings. There was a W Cail practising as a solicitor in Newcastle around that time, but it is not known if they were one and the same.
 Edward Charlton - writer & historian
 Dr Clark - historian/antiquarian whose brief comment on John Shield's work is noted on page 65 of Thomas Allan's Illustrated Edition of Tyneside Songs and Readings
 James Thomas Clephan - Journalist and songwriter/poet
 David Dippie Dixon - A historian who added much to the knowledge of the area and its language
 Scott Dobson - A 20th-century writer of prose and humorous books, mainly in broad Geordie dialect
 John Woodham Dunn - An Anglican vicar and author who added much to the knowledge of the area and its language
 Dennis Embleton - Medical doctor, surgeon, naturalist, historian and poet
 George Clementson Greenwell - A mining engineer, whose writings defined many of the words and terms used in mining
 Richard Oliver Heslop - historian/lexicologist/songwriter/poet/ etc.
 Eneas Mackenzie - A historian who added much to the knowledge of the area and its language
 Sir Walter Scott - He may have transcribed "Bewick and the Graeme'" according to the comment on page 25 of Stokoe and Bruce'a Northumbrian Minstrelsy.
 James Shotton - Artist
 Robert Surtees - A historian who added much to the knowledge of the area and its language
 Robert Wilson - A physician, whose published papers on mining added to the area's history.

See also 
 Geordie dialect words
 Allan's Illustrated Edition of Tyneside Songs and Readings
 Fordyce’s Tyne Songster
 France's Songs of the Bards of the Tyne - 1850
 The Bishoprick Garland (1834, by Sharp)
 Rhymes of Northern Bards
 Marshall's Collection of Songs, Comic, Satirical 1827
 The Songs of the Tyne by Ross
 The Songs of the Tyne by Walker
 Marshall's A Collection of Original Local Songs

References

External links
 Allan's Illustrated Edition of Tyneside Songs and Readings
 The Tyne Songster by W & T Fordyce – 1840
 France's Songs of the Bards of the Tyne – 1850
 Marshall's Collection of Songs, Comic, Satirical 1827
 The Songs of the Tyne by Ross
 Sharpe's Bishoprick Garland 1834
 Bards of Newcastle
 Wor Geordie songwriters
 Bell’s Rhymes of Northern Bards
 The Songs of the Tyne by Walker

Geordie songwriters